Sarah Jane Witherspoon is an American mathematician interested in topics in abstract algebra, including Hochschild cohomology and quantum groups.
She is a professor of mathematics at Texas A&M University

Education 
Witherspoon graduated from Arizona State University in 1988, where she earned the Charles Wexler Mathematics Prize as the best mathematics student at ASU that year. 
She went on to graduate study in mathematics at the University of Chicago, and completed her Ph.D. in 1994. Her dissertation, supervised by Jonathan Lazare Alperin, was The Representation Ring of the Quantum Double of a Finite Group.

Career 
Witherspoon taught at the University of Toronto from 1994 to 1998.
After holding visiting assistant professorships at
Mills College, the University of Wisconsin–Madison,
Mount Holyoke College, the University of Massachusetts Amherst, and
Amherst College, she joined the Texas A&M faculty in 2004.

Honors and awards 
She was elected to the 2018 class of fellows of the American Mathematical Society, "for contributions to representation theory and cohomology of Hopf algebras, quantum groups, and related objects, and for service to the profession and mentoring". She was named MSRI Simons Professor for Spring 2020.

Selected publications

References

External links
Home page

Year of birth missing (living people)
Living people
21st-century American mathematicians
American women mathematicians
Arizona State University alumni
University of Chicago alumni
Academic staff of the University of Toronto
Mills College faculty
University of Wisconsin–Madison faculty
Mount Holyoke College faculty
University of Massachusetts Amherst faculty
Amherst College faculty
Texas A&M University faculty
Fellows of the American Mathematical Society
21st-century women mathematicians
21st-century American women